Otoplanidae is a family of flatworms belonging to the order Proseriata.

Genera

Genera:
 Alaskaplana Ax & Armonies, 1990
 Americanaplana Ax & Ax, 1967
 Archotoplana Ax, 1956

References

Platyhelminthes